Pectoral  may refer to:
 The chest region and anything relating to it.
 Pectoral cross, a cross worn on the chest
 a decorative, usually jeweled version of a gorget
 Pectoral (Ancient Egypt), a type of jewelry worn in ancient Egypt
 Pectoralis major muscle, commonly referred to as "pectorals" or "pecs"
 Pectoralis minor muscle
 Pectoral fins of an aquatic animal, such as a whale or fish, located on both sides of the body
 Pectoral sandpiper, a bird